Himeroconcha is a genus of small air-breathing land snails, terrestrial pulmonate gastropod mollusks in the family Charopidae.

Species
Species within the genus Himeroconcha include:
 Himeroconcha fusca
 Himeroconcha lamlanensis
 Himeroconcha quadrasi
 Himeroconcha rotula

References

 Nomenclator Zoologicus info

 
Charopidae
Taxonomy articles created by Polbot